Galen University is an independent university in Belize, Central America, with sustainable development as one of its core values. Its main campus is in Central Farm at mile 64 George Price Highway, in the Cayo District. The university is chartered and recognized by the Ministry of Education of the Government of Belize to offer degrees at undergraduate and graduate levels in educational programs such as business, arts, sciences, and education. About 95 percent of the students are Belizean students seeking Bachelor's and Master's degrees. The remainder are students participating in study abroad programs. The institution was established in 2003.

History 
Galen University was founded in September 2003 with an initial intake of 14 students and is Belize's only privately administered tertiary institution. Galen's first program offerings were bachelor's degrees in Business Administration, Agriculture and Tourism Management.

Academics

Faculties
 Faculty of Arts, Sciences and Technology
 Faculty of Business and Entrepreneurship 
 Faculty of Education

Programs of study include:

Faculty of Arts, Science, and Technology
 Anthropology
 Computer Science
 Criminal Justice
 Environmental Science
 Veterinary Technician
 Master's in Development Studies

Faculty of Business and Entrepreneurship
 Accounting
 Business Administration
 Entrepreneurship
 Hospitality and Tourism Management
 International business
 Marketing
 Master's in Business Administration
 Certificate in Accounting

Faculty of Education
 Elementary Education
 Secondary Education
Diploma Programs
Certificate in Education Leadership

Governance 

Galen University is governed by a Board of Trustees headed by a chairman. The government, conduct, management, and control of the academic aspects of the university are vested in this Board. The Board of Trustees includes:

 Dr. Rene Villanueva Sr. 
 Mrs Karen Bevans
 Mr. Daniel Silva
 Dr. Marcelino Avila 
 Dr. Godwin Hulse
 Mr. Hugh O'Brien 
 Mr. Henry Anderson 
 Dr. Cynthia Eve Aird
 Mr. Raineldo Guerrero

Applied research   
Galen University has an applied research and development institute (GUARD) engaged in sustainable social, cultural, environmental, political and economic development projects. GUARD works with Central American and Caribbean government departments, non-governmental organizations (NGOs), and the private sector to address social and environmental issues. Galen University offers technical assistance and coordination services to these organizations. A university-wide approach is taken through the use of faculty, staff, and students trained for data collection and data entry. This extension of Galen's resources creates learning opportunities and facilitates the power of networking with other worldwide institutions or organizations.

Name 
Galen University was named in honor of the Greek scholar and physician, Galen, who lived from 130 to 220 A.D.

References

External links
 Official site

Universities in Belize